Saint Crispus of Chalcedon was a bishop of Chalcedon.  He is mentioned in First Corinthians 1:14.  He was a ruler of the Jewish Synagogue at Corinth,  He and his household were converted to Christianity by Paul of Tarsus (Acts 18:8).  He was baptized by Paul in Corinth, Greece.  He later served as Bishop of Chalcedon.  He was martyred for his faith.

Crispus' feast day is October 4 and he is counted among the Seventy disciples in the Eastern Orthodox Church.

References

External links
Crispus and Gaius

Seventy disciples
1st-century Christian martyrs
1st-century bishops in Roman Anatolia
Early Jewish Christians
People in Acts of the Apostles
People in the Pauline epistles
First Epistle to the Corinthians
Bishops of Chalcedon